The Black Veil is a 1995 Russian crime film directed by Aleksandr Proshkin.

Plot 
The film tells about a rich and charming philanthropist who was found dead in his house. The investigator finds a blue envelope and concludes that the philanthropist was killed.

Cast 
 Irina Metlitskaya
 Aleksandr Abdulov
 Tatyana Vasileva
 Sergey Makovetsky
 Irina Rozanova
 Natalya Petrova
 Margarita Shubina		
 Vladimir Ilyin
 Pyotr Yandanov
 Valeri Doronin

References

External links 
 

1995 films
1990s Russian-language films
Russian crime films
Russian detective films
1995 crime films